László Szilágyi may refer to the following Hungarian people:

Ladislaus Szilágyi, 15th century nobleman and general
László Szilágyi (judoka)
László Szilágyi (politician)
László Szilágyi (writer)